West Carleton-March Ward (Ward 5) is a city ward in Ottawa, Ontario, Canada.

The ward was created for the 2000 election when West Carleton Township was amalgamated into the new city of Ottawa. At that time, the ward was called West Carleton Ward. It consisted of the former West Carleton Township. In 2006, the boundaries were altered, and the ward was given its present name. Its southern border became Highway 7 and the Queensway and it lost some areas in the southeastern part of the ward. The ward also added the rural northern portion of the former city of Kanata. Its population in 2006 was 23,400 – the second least populated ward. Its area is 763 km², the largest city ward. It was represented by Eli El-Chantiry on Ottawa City Council from 2003 until 2022 when he retired. Clarke Kelly won the 2022 election to represent the ward.

Following the 2020 Ottawa Ward boundary review, the ward lost small sections of territory in the South March area and north of Stittsville to accommodate proposed housing developments.

Communities
Communities in the ward include Antrim, Fitzroy Harbour, Galetta, Kinburn, Marathon, Marathon Village, Marshall Bay, Mohr Corners, Panmure, Quyon Ferry Landing, Smith's Corners, Vydon Acres, Willola Beach, Woodridge, Baskin's Beach, Buckhams Bay, Constance Bay, Crown Point, Dirleton, Dunrobin, Dunrobin Heights, Dunrobin Shore, Kilmaurs, MacLarens, McKay's Waterfront, Torwood Estates, Woodlawn, Carp, Corkery, Huntley, Huntley Manor Estates, Manion Corners, Westmont Estates, Westwood, Marchhurst, Harwood Plains and Malwood.

City councillors
On regional council, the area was located within Western Townships Ward, which was split up between Goulbourn Ward and Rideau Ward upon amalgamation.

Dwight Eastman (2000–2003)
Eli El-Chantiry (2003–2022)
Clarke Kelly (2022–present)

Election results

2000 Ottawa municipal election

2003 Ottawa municipal election

2006 Ottawa municipal election
Incumbent councillor Eli El-Chantiry, a Liberal, who won his last election by 29 votes, faces the more Conservative opponent of J.P. Dorion. Dorion has worked for Arnprior Ottawa Auto Parts for 12 years.

2010 Ottawa municipal election

2014 Ottawa municipal election

2018 Ottawa municipal election

2022 Ottawa municipal election

References

External links
 Map of West Carleton-March Ward

Ottawa wards